The LSU Tigers football team has had 326 players drafted into the National Football League (NFL) since the league began holding drafts in 1936. This includes 42 players taken in the first round and three overall number one picks: Billy Cannon (1960 NFL Draft), Jamarcus Russell (2007 NFL Draft) and Joe Burrow (2020 NFL Draft). Six former LSU players have been elected to the Pro Football Hall of Fame: Steve Van Buren, Y. A. Tittle, Jim Taylor, Johnny Robinson, Alan Faneca, and Kevin Mawae. As of the beginning of the 2015 NFL season, there were 40 former LSU players on active rosters in the NFL, the most of any college program.

Each NFL franchise seeks to add new players through the annual NFL Draft. The draft rules were last updated in 2009. The team with the worst record the previous year picks first, the next-worst team second, and so on. Teams that did not make the playoffs are ordered by their regular-season record with any remaining ties broken by strength of schedule. Playoff participants are sequenced after non-playoff teams, based on their round of elimination (wild card, division, conference, and Super Bowl). Prior to the merger agreements in 1966, the American Football League (AFL) operated in direct competition with the NFL and held a separate draft. This led to a bidding war over top prospects between the two leagues. As part of the merger agreement on June 8, 1966, the two leagues held a multiple round "Common Draft". Once the AFL officially merged with the NFL in 1970, the "Common Draft" became the NFL Draft.

Key

NFL and AFL selections

National Football League

American Football League

Notes
 Because of the NFL–AFL merger agreement, the history of the AFL is officially recognized by the NFL and therefore this list includes the AFL Draft (1960–1966) and the Common Draft (1967–1969.
 Calculation of total number of LSU players drafted – If a player was selected in both the NFL and AFL drafts, he was only counted once. If a player was drafted by NFL, but did not enter the league and was redrafted he was counted multiple times. Expansion draft choices are not included in total.
 Calculation of total number of LSU First-Round draft picks – If a player was selected in the first-round of either the NFL or AFL draft, he was included in total number of LSU First-Round draft picks and was only counted once. If a player was drafted by NFL, but did not enter the league and was redrafted he was counted multiple times.
 (RS) – Denotes "Redshirt Draft" by the AFL in 1965 and 1966.
 Exp. – Denotes draft picks in NFL expansion draft.
 Sup. – Denotes draft picks in the NFL supplemental draft. The supplemental draft is held to accommodate players who did not enter the regular draft. The draft is scheduled to occur at some point after the regular draft and before the start of the next season.

Notable undrafted players
Note: No drafts held before 1920

References

LSU

LSU Tigers NFL Draft